Madrasa Andaloussiya also known as the Madrasa El Younsiya, is a tunisian Madrasah in the Medina of Tunis. It also called Madrasa of Sidi El Ajmi because it is close to his zaouia.

Location 

It is located in R+Errakah Street, in the jewish hood El Hara near the mausoleum of the saint Abi Ahmed Mohamed Younes also known as Sidi Younes in the Medina.

History

The madrasa was built by the group of muslims who came to Tunis after getting expelled from Spain following the rules of Philip III of Spain in 1609.

This community that contributed to the development of the kingdom on  social, economical and cultural scales, built the Soubhan Allah Mosque in Bab Souika as well.

Current situation

Nowadays, the madrasa is the officie of an association for disabled people.

References 

Madrasas in the medina of Tunis